Lagaroceras is a genus of fruit flies in the family Chloropidae. There are about 19 described species in Lagaroceras.

Species
These 19 species belong to the genus Lagaroceras:

 Lagaroceras annulatum Deeming, 1981 c g
 Lagaroceras anomalum Lamb, 1917 c g
 Lagaroceras australis Deeming, 1981 c g
 Lagaroceras cogani Deeming, 1981 c g
 Lagaroceras curtum Sabrosky, 1961 c g
 Lagaroceras deceptivum Spencer, 1986 c g
 Lagaroceras distinctum Deeming, 1981 c g
 Lagaroceras infuscatum Lamb, 1917 c g
 Lagaroceras longicorne (Thomson, 1869) c g
 Lagaroceras megalops Becker, 1903 c g
 Lagaroceras nigra Yang & Yang, 1995 c g
 Lagaroceras nigroscutellatum Deeming, 1981 c g
 Lagaroceras opaculum Becker, 1910 c g
 Lagaroceras princeps (Becker, 1910) c g
 Lagaroceras pulchellum Lamb, 1917 c g
 Lagaroceras queenslandicum Spencer, 1986 c g
 Lagaroceras septentrionalis Spencer, 1986 c g
 Lagaroceras sequens Becker, 1910 c g
 Lagaroceras tenuicorne Malloch, 1927 c g

Data sources: i = ITIS, c = Catalogue of Life, g = GBIF, b = Bugguide.net

References

Further reading

External links

 

Chloropinae
Chloropidae genera